A list of the most notable films produced in the Cinema of Mexico split by decade of release. For an alphabetical list of articles on Mexican films see :Category:Mexican films.

1896-1919

 List of Mexican films of the 1890s
 List of Mexican films of the 1900s
 List of Mexican films of the 1910s

1920s
Mexican films of the 1920s

1930s
Mexican films of the 1930s

1940s
Mexican films of the 1940s

1950s
Mexican films of the 1950s

1960s
Mexican films of the 1960s

1970s
Mexican films of the 1970s

1980s
Mexican films of the 1980s

1990s
Mexican films of the 1990s

2000s
Mexican films of the 2000s

2010s
Mexican films of the 2010s

2020s
Mexican films of the 2020s

External links
 Mexican film at the Internet Movie Database
 Top 10 Movies from Mexico according to the Internet Movie Database